Spencer Park (currently known as Corporate Travel Management Stadium) is a football stadium located in the suburb of Newmarket, north of Brisbane, Queensland, Australia. It is home to Football Queensland Premier League team Brisbane City FC. The stadium, while officially holding 10,000, seats only 3,000 under the grandstand, the Gino Merlo Stand. The grandstand is mainly concrete steps with a small number of seats in the middle of the stand. There are also corporate boxes at the back of the grandstand. There are 4 entrances to the grandstand, 2 on each end and 2 in the middle, which are directly above the home and away  changing room tunnels. The entrances are locked on FQPL matches. Brisbane City charge for stadium entry at the gates, ($2 children $5 adult $10 family). There is also concrete steps for seating below the terrace outside the clubhouse.  The stadium opened in 1963 on the site of an old Brisbane City Council waste disposal site, and underwent a major renovation in 1981 with the construction of the Gino Merlo Stand. The stadium is home to La Rustica restaurant, where traditional Italian foods, including pizza, are served.

References

Soccer venues in Queensland
Sports venues in Brisbane
Sports venues completed in 1963
1963 establishments in Australia
Newmarket, Queensland
Brisbane City FC